Western Reserve High School is a public high school in Collins, Ohio, part of Townsend Township, within Huron County.  Consolidated in 1952 under the name of Townsend-Wakeman High School from two previous smaller high schools at Townsend in Townsend Township and Wakeman, in the village of Wakeman, Ohio before changing to its current name in 1959 when the new school building was built.  It is the only high school in the Western Reserve Local School District, which includes the nearby village of Wakeman.  Their nickname is the "Roughriders".  They are members of the Firelands Conference in the Ohio High School Athletic Association, and wear the colors of blue and white.

References

External links
 

High schools in Huron County, Ohio
Public high schools in Ohio
Western Reserve, Ohio